William Cesar Farrell (born October 6, 1934) is an American diver. He competed in the men's 10 metre platform event at the 1956 Summer Olympics.

References

External links
 
 

1934 births
Living people
American male divers
Olympic divers of the United States
Divers at the 1956 Summer Olympics
Sportspeople from Los Angeles